Paweł Jędrzejczyk (born 15 November 1980) is a Polish welterweight kickboxer and Muay Thai kickboxer. He is four time World Kickboxing Network Champion and one time World Kickboxing Association World Champion. He is first Polish fighter contracted by Glory.

Personal life 

He is born in Wrocław. He is married to Natalia with one daughter.

Muay Thai and Kickboxing amateur career 

He used to live in Thailand with his parents as a child. He started training kickboxing and Muay Thai at age 19. He fought his first amateur fight at age 24. In 2004 he was picked by Polish National Team starting to fight internationally.

Professional career 

In 2009 he won his first WKN World Champion title (K-1 rules) in Nowa Sól Poland. After five rounds he won on points against Angelo Silva from Portugal. In 2010 he lost his title against Abder Khader Ahmed of Egypt. Wergi lost on points.

One year later he fought for another WKN World Title (79.400 kg) in Zielona Góra Poland at Makowski Fighting Championship event. Pawel won by KO in 4th round against Mukutadze Ednari.

On 3 December 2011 he won by KO against Hugo Miguel Rodríguez Méndez and won his first Muay Thai World Title at Nowa Sól, Poland during  event.

In 2009 he started to train and fight in Thailand. After few fights he got a shot to fight at legendary Rajadamnern Stadium at 16.09.2012 in Bangkok. He won in first round by KO against Thai Champion Cheerchai Petchpaothong and became first Polish Fighter who fought and won there.

In 2013 he fought at old Lumpinee Stadium in Bangkok and lost on points with Gareth Nellies of England. In the same year he became World Kickboxing Network World Champion one more time, winning on points against Dimitar Iliev.

After 15 months of break caused by injury he won his fifth World Title. This Time he won by KO in fifth round via low kicks against Josip Balentovich. He became Thai Boxing WKA World Champion.

On 7 February 2015 he got the rematch with Gareth Nellies at New Lumpinee Boxing Stadium and won. On 24 May 2015 he won against F16 Rajanont in Pattaya at Max Muay Thai event. On 16 August 2016 he drew with Ekapop Sityodtong at another Max Muay Thai event.

In January 2016 Paweł Jędrzejczyk signed a contract with Glory. He lost on his debut to Richard Abraham at Glory 27 in Chicago. In 2017 he will fight again for Glory in Chicago.

Paweł Jędrzejczyk is ranked on the first place in the "Polish male kickboxers rankings" at Madfight24.com.

Achievements 
 2007 
 European Champion Muay Thai WMF 
 2009
 World Champion K1 Rules WKN  
 2011
 World Champion Muay Thai WKN 
 World Champion Oriental Rules WKN  
 2013
 World Champion Kickboxing BB Rules WKN 
 2014
 World Champion Thai Boxing WKA 
 2017
Makowski FIghting Championship Champion

Professional kickboxing record 

|-
|-
|-  bgcolor="#CCFFCC"
|16.09.2017 
| Win 
| align="left" | Guilllermo Blokland 
| MFC 
| Zielona Góra, Poland 
| Decision 
| 5 (5) 
| 3:00
|-
! style=background:white colspan=9 |
|- 
|-  bgcolor="#FFBBBB"
| 24.02.2017 
| Loss
| align="left" | Daniel Morales 
| Glory 38 
| Chicago, United States 
| Decision 
| 3 
| 3:00
|-  bgcolor="#CCFFCC"
| 03.12.2016 
| Win 
| align="left" | Matouš Kohout 
| MFC11 
| Nowa Sól, Poland 
| Decision 
| 3 
| 3:00
|-  bgcolor="#CCFFCC"
| 24.09.2016 
| Win 
| align="left" | Triantafyllos Alexandridis  
| MFC10 
| Zielona Góra, Poland 
| Decision 
| 3 
| 3:00
|-  bgcolor="#FFBBBB"
| 26.02.2016 
| Loss 
| align="left" | Richard Abraham  
| Glory 27 
| Chicago , United States 
| Decision 
| 3 
| 3:00
|-  bgcolor="#FFBBBB"
| 24.10.2015 
| Loss 
| align="left" | Thanelek 
| MAC1 
| Wrocław, Poland 
| Decision 
| 5 
| 3:00
|-  bgcolor="#FFBBBB"
| 12.09.2015 
| Loss 
| align="left" | Eyevan Dannenberg 
| MFC8 
| Zielona Góra, Poland 
| Decision 
| 3 
| 3:00
|-  bgcolor="#CCFFCC"
| 16.08.2015 
| Draw 
| align="left" | Ekapop Sityodtong 
| Max Muay Thai Stadium Pattaya 
| Pattaya, Thailand
| Decision 
| 3 
| 3:00
|-  bgcolor="#CCFFCC"
| 24.05.2015 
| Win 
| align="left" | F-16 Rachanon
| Max Muay Thai Stadium Pattaya 
| Pattaya, Thailand
| Decision 
| 3 
| 3:00
|-  bgcolor="#CCFFCC"
| 07.02.2015 
| Win 
| align="left" | Gareth Nellies 
| Lumpinee Ramintra Stadium 
| Lumpinee Ramintra Stadium, Bangkok 
| Decision 
| 5 
| 3:00
|-  bgcolor="#CCFFCC"
| 13.12.2014 
| Win 
| align="left" | Daniel Menino Rosales 
| MFC7 
| Nowa Sól, Poland 
| Decision 
| 3 
| 3:00
|-
! style=background:white colspan=9 |
|- 
|-  bgcolor="#CCFFCC"
| 23.08.2014 
| Win 
| align="left" | Josip Balentovich 
| Noc Góralskich Wojowników 
| Zakopane, Poland 
| TKO 
| 5 (5) 
| 2:00
|-  bgcolor="#CCFFCC"
| 24.05.2013 
| Win 
| align="left" | Dimitar Iliev 
| Bigger's Better 22 
| Zakopane, Poland 
| Decision 
| 5 
| 2:00
|-
! style=background:white colspan=9 |
|- 
|-  bgcolor="#FFBBBB"
| 05.02.2013 
| Loss 
| align="left" | Gareth Nellies 
| Lumpinee Boxing Stadium 
| Lumpinee Boxing Stadium, Bangkok 
| Decision 
| 5 
| 3:00
|-  bgcolor="#CCFFCC"
| 08.12.2012 
| Win
| align="left" | Eddie Gill 
|  MFC5 
| Nowa Sól, Poland 
| Decision 
| 3 
| 3:00
|-  bgcolor="#CCFFCC"
| 16.09.2012 
| Win 
| align="left" | Cheerchai Petchpaothong 
| Rajadamnern Stadium 
| Rajadamnern Stadium, Bangkok 
| KO 
| 1 (5) 
| 1:50
|-  bgcolor="#FFBBBB"
| 06.02.2012 
| Loss 
| align="left" | Petkarat 
| WMC Event 
| Petchbuncha Stadium, Thailand
| Decision 
| 5 
| 3:00
|-  bgcolor="#CCFFCC"
|03.12.2011 
| Win 
| align="left" | Hugo Miguel Rodrigues Mendes 
|  MFC4 
| Nowa Sól, Poland 
| KO 
| 1 (5) 
| 1:00
|-  bgcolor="#CCFFCC"
|05.11.2011 
| Win 
| align="left" | Michele Germele 
| IronFist 4 
| Szczecin, Poland 
| KO
| 3 (3) 
| 0:30
|-  bgcolor="#CCFFCC"
|07.05.2011 
| Win 
| align="left" | Mukutadze Ednari 
| MFC 
| Zielona Góra, Poland 
| KO 
| 4 (5) 
| 2:20
|-
! style=background:white colspan=9 |
|- 
|-  bgcolor="#CCFFCC"
|12.02.2011 
| Win 
| align="left" | Sapapet 
| Gala WMC 
| Thailand
| KO 
| 1 (5) 
| 2:40
|-  bgcolor="#CCFFCC"
|06.11.2010 
| Win 
| align="left" | Jafar Mukri 
| Ironfist3 
| Szczecin, Poland 
| Decision 
| 3 
| 3:00
|-  bgcolor="#FFBBBB"
|25.09.2010 
| Loss 
| align="left" | Abdel Kader Ahmed 
| WKN Champ Class Fight Night2 
| Nowa Sól, Poland 
| Decision 
| 5 
| 3:00
|-
! style=background:white colspan=9 |
|- 
|-  bgcolor="#CCFFCC"
|17.04.2010 
| Win 
| align="left" | Sod Pornchaichumpon 
| Gala WMC 
| Thailand
| Decision 
| 5 
| 3:00
|-  bgcolor="#CCFFCC"
|13.02.2010 
| Win 
| align="left" | Salatun 
| WMC Charity for Haiti 
| Thailand
| Decision 
| 5 
| 3:00
|-  bgcolor="#CCFFCC"
|05.12.2009	
| Win 
| align="left" | Angelo Silva 
| WKN Champ Class Fight Night 
| Nowa Sól, Poland 
| Decision 
| 5 
| 3:00
|-
! style=background:white colspan=9 |
|- 
|-  bgcolor="#CCFFCC"
|26.09.2009	
| Win 
| align="left" | Daniel Vitovec 
| Iron Fist 
| Szczecin, Poland 
| Decision 
| 5 
| 3:00
|-  bgcolor="#CCFFCC"
|12.06.2009	
| Win 
| align="left" | Wojciech Wilczkowiak 
| XFS 3 
| Poznań, Poland 
| Decision 
| 3 
| 3:00
|-  bgcolor="#FFBBBB"
|31.01.2009	
| Loss 
| align="left" | Peley 
| Gala WMC Thai boxing 
| Thailand
| Decision 
| 5 
| 3:00
|-  bgcolor="#CCFFCC"
|03.10.2008
| Win 
| align="left" | Ramazan Beyazkaya 
| WKN Event 
| Turkey
| Decision 
| 3 
| 3:00
|-  bgcolor="#CCFFCC"
|06.01.2007 
| Win 
| align="left" | Wojciech Hoły 
| ISKA Night of Glory 
| Nowy Targ, Poland 
| Decision 
| 7 
| 2:00

References

External links  
 Official website 

Polish male kickboxers
Polish Muay Thai practitioners
1980 births
Living people
Sportspeople from Wrocław